Mario Romero may refer to:

 Mario Romero (poet) (1943–1998), Argentine poet, playwright and translator
 Mario Romero (Nicaraguan boxer), Nicaraguan Olympic boxer
 Mario Romero (Venezuelan boxer), Venezuelan Olympic boxer
 Mario Antonio Romero (born 1980), Argentine football striker
 Mario Luna Romero, tribal secretary of the Yaqui tribe of Vicam, Sonora